This is a list of notable events in music that took place in the year 1988.

Specific locations
1988 in British music
1988 in Norwegian music

Specific genres
1988 in country music
1988 in heavy metal music
1988 in hip hop music
1988 in jazz

Events

January–March
January 3 – The Cinemax television special Roy Orbison and Friends, A Black and White Night, recorded on September 30, 1987, at the Coconut Grove in Los Angeles, USA, is broadcast.
January 20 – The Rock and Roll Hall of Fame ceremony inducts The Beach Boys, The Beatles, The Drifters, Bob Dylan and The Supremes.
January 28 – A Tampa, Florida, man files an unusual lawsuit against Mötley Crüe. Matthew John Trippe, who has a history of mental health issues and trouble with the law, claims that he was secretly hired to pose as Nikki Sixx and toured, wrote and recorded with the band for a time during 1983 and 1984. Trippe drops the lawsuit in 1993.
February 8 – Kenney Jones would last perform as the drummer for The Who at the British Phonographic Industry awards ceremony, where the band received the Lifetime Achievement Award.
March 2 – The 30th Annual Grammy Awards are presented in New York, hosted by Billy Crystal. U2's The Joshua Tree wins Album of the Year, Paul Simon's "Graceland" wins Record of the Year and Linda Ronstadt & James Ingram's "Somewhere Out There" wins Song of the Year. Jody Watley wins Best New Artist.
March 10 - Pop star Andy Gibb dies at a hospital in Oxford, England five days after his 30th birthday. 
March 26 – "Man in the Mirror" by Michael Jackson from the Bad album tops the Billboard Hot 100. It's the first time in history a solo artist has had four Number One singles from the same album.

April–June
April 7 – Alice Cooper almost dies on stage when one of the props, the Gallows, malfunctions.
April 19 – Former rock and roll singer Sonny Bono is inaugurated as the Mayor of Palm Springs, California, USA.
April 23 - Whitney Houston's "Where Do Broken Hearts Go" top the Billboard Hot 100 and became Houston's 7th consecutive number-one single surpassing the record of The Beatles and Bee Gees which have 6.
April 25 – Rock supermanager Doc McGhee is sentenced to five years probation after pleading guilty to charges of drug smuggling stemming from a 1982 seizure of nearly 40,000 pounds of marijuana entering North Carolina from Colombia.
April 30 – The Eurovision Song Contest, held in the RDS Simmonscourt Pavilion, Dublin, is won by French-Canadian singer Celine Dion, representing Switzerland with the song "Ne partez pas sans moi".
May 14 – Atlantic Records stages a concert at Madison Square Garden celebrating its Fortieth birthday with performances by many of the label's greatest acts of the past. Artists include Crosby, Stills & Nash, Iron Butterfly, Ruth Brown, Foreigner and Wilson Pickett, but the most talked-about performance is by a reunited Led Zeppelin with Jason Bonham on drums.
May 27 – The Monsters of Rock Tour 1988 commences in East Troy, Wisconsin. Van Halen headlines with the other acts on the bill consisting of Metallica, Scorpions, Dokken and Kingdom Come.
June 18 – Depeche Mode play to a crowd of 60,000 at the Rose Bowl in Pasadena, California. The concert was filmed and recorded by D. A. Pennebaker for the group's documentary-concert film and live album 101.
June 27 – Motown Records is sold to MCA and an investment firm for $61 million.

July–September
July 2 – Michael Jackson with fifth single from Bad, "Dirty Diana", he broke the record to have five consecutive charting singles from same album at the top of the Billboard Hot 100, is the first artist and only male in history to achieve this.
August 12 – Public Enemy garners publicity by staging a concert at Riker's Island prison for 250 inmates and 100 journalists.
September 6–9 – Elton John auctions off many items from his personal collection, including memorabilia and stage-worn clothing, at Sotheby's for a total of $8.5 million. John had been known for wearing flamboyant stage costumes during the glam rock era of the 1970s, but he increasingly abandoned them in later years.
September 10 – Billboard magazine publishes its Hot Modern Rock Tracks chart for the first time.
September 24 – James Brown faces a variety of charges after leading police on an interstate chase, after reportedly breaking into a seminar in an Augusta, Georgia, building he owned an office in, waving a gun and demanding to know who had used his restrooms. Earlier in the year Brown had been arrested on drug and firearms-related charges.
September 25 – The Aalto Theatre, Essen, Germany, opens with a performance of Die Meistersinger von Nürnberg.

October–December
October 10 – The new Cairo Opera House is inaugurated by President Hosni Mubarak and Prince Tomohito of Mikasa, brother of the Emperor of Japan.  The opening ceremony includes a kabuki performance in recognition of the funds donated by Japan.
November 7 – John Fogerty wins a self-plagiarism lawsuit with Fantasy Records. The record label had contended that Fogerty's 1985 comeback hit "The Old Man Down the Road" was too similar to his 1970 Creedence Clearwater Revival song, "Run Through the Jungle".
November 12 – U2's Rattle and Hum hits the Number One spot on the U.S. charts, the first double album to do so since Bruce Springsteen's The River in 1980.
December 4 – Singer Roy Orbison gives his last concert in Akron, Ohio, USA, before his death from a heart attack.
 December 28 – Madonna calls sheriff's officers to the Malibu, California home she shared with her soon-to-be ex-husband Sean Penn. Penn is rumored to have threatened to attack or kill Madonna, tied her up, and threatened to cut her hair. These rumors have been denied by both Madonna and Penn.
December 31 – The 17th annual New Year's Rockin' Eve special airs on ABC, with appearances by Natalie Cole, Taylor Dayne, DJ Jazzy Jeff & The Fresh Prince, Richard Marx, Reba McEntire and Frankie Valli and The Four Seasons.

Also in 1988
 Peter Ruzicka becomes director of the Hamburg State Opera and State Philharmonic Orchestra.
 Andrew Davis begins a term as chief conductor of the BBC Symphony Orchestra, and is appointed musical director of Glyndebourne Festival Opera, effective with the 1989 season.
 "I Heard It Through the Grapevine" experiences a surge in popularity in the USA sparked by television commercials featuring claymation raisin figures dancing to the song. The California Raisins version of the song peaks at number 84 on the Billboard Hot 100.

Bands formed 
 See Musical groups established in 1988

Bands disbanded 
See Musical groups disestablished in 1988

Albums released

January–March

April–June

July–September

October–December

Release date unknown

 The Acapella Project – Glad
 Atomic Arena – Barren Cross
 Born 2 B Blue – Steve Miller
 Can't Buy a Miracle – Randy Stonehill
 The Chess Box – Chuck Berry (compilation)
 Colin James – Colin James
 Come out Fighting – Greg X. Volz
 Don't Forget the Struggle, Don't Forget the Streets – Warzone
 The Dubliner's Dublin – The Dubliners
 English Rebel Songs 1381-1984 – Chumbawamba
 Flowers in the Rain (album) – Mad at the World
 Go Off! – Cacophony
 Godflesh – Godflesh (EP)
 Greg Howe – Greg Howe
 Hallowed Ground – Skin Yard
 Home Is Where the Heart Is – David Grisman
 The House of Love – The House of Love
 Human Sacrifice – Vengeance Rising
 I Used to Be an Animal – Eric Burdon 
 In Heat – Black 'N Blue
 Irish Heartbeat – Van Morrison & The Chieftains
 It Won't Be Long – Shout
 King Kobra III – King Kobra
 Let's Spin! – The Swirling Eddies
 Little Love Affairs – Nanci Griffith
 Live – Bad Brains
 The Live Brain Wedgie/WAD – Ween
 Live to Die – Bride
 Lovely – The Primitives
 Lucinda Williams – Lucinda Williams
 Mistress Music – Burning Spear
 My Gift to You – Alexander O'Neal

 No Man's Land – Various Artists
 Nothing Exceeds Like Excess – Raven
 Nothing Wrong – Red Lorry Yellow Lorry 
 On Fire! – Petra 
 Perpetual Burn – Jason Becker
 Phil Keaggy and Sunday's Child – Phil Keaggy
 A Place to Stand – Geoff Moore + The Distance
 Prostitute – Toyah
 Radio Free Albemuth – Stuart Hamm
 Read All About It – Newsboys
 Reel Life – Boy Meets Girl 
 Remote – Hue & Cry
 Rock in a Hard Place – Bloodgood
 Rough Night in Jericho – Dreams So Real
 The Rumour – Olivia Newton-John
 Savvy Show Stoppers – Shadowy Men on a Shadowy Planet
 Shadowland – k.d. lang
 Shake Sugaree - Taj Mahal
 Silence Screams - REZ 
 Soliloquy for Lilith – Nurse With Wound
 Stay Awake: Various Interpretations of Music from Vintage Disney Films – Various Artists
 STP Not LSD – Angry Samoans
 Streets of This Town – Steve Forbert
 Swastikas for Noddy – Current 93
 Time Odyssey – Vinnie Moore 
 Today – Galaxie 500
 Tommy Page – Tommy Page
 Too Late for Living – Saint
 Tough Love – Idle Cure
 Volunteer – Sham 69
 The Walking – Jane Siberry
 What Up, Dog? – Was (Not Was)
 The Winter of '88 – Johnny Winter
 Workin' Band – Nitty Gritty Dirt Band
 Yeah, Whatever – Moev

Singles released in 1988

Biggest hit singles 
The following songs achieved the highest chart positions
in the charts of 1988.

U.S. best selling singles 
The following singles achieved the highest chart positions in the U.S. in 1988.

Top selling albums of the year in the US
 George Michael – Faith
 Madonna – You Can Dance
 Michael Jackson – Bad
 Guns N' Roses – Appetite for Destruction

Top 40 Chart hit singles

Other Chart hit singles

Notable singles

Other Notable singles

Classical music 
 Gerald Barry – Cheveux-de-frise
 Luciano Berio – Sequenza XI
 George Crumb – Zeitgeist (Tableaux Vivants) for two amplified pianos
 Mario Davidovsky – Synchronisms No. 9 for violin and tape
 Joël-François Durand – Die innere Grenze for string sextet
 Lorenzo Ferrero – La cena delle beffe (incidental music)
 Michael Finnissy – Red Earth for orchestra
 Henryk Górecki – String Quartet No. 1, "Already it is Dusk"
 Stephen Hartke – Pacific Rim Overture
 Vagn Holmboe – Symphony No. 12, M. 338
 Wojciech Kilar – Choralvorspiel (Choral Prelude) for chamber string orchestra
 Witold Lutosławski – Concerto for Piano and Orchestra
 Frederik Magle – We Are Afraid (Vi er bange), cantata for choir and chamber orchestra
 Carin Malmlöf-Forssling – String Quartet No. 1, "Silverkvartetten"
 António Chagas Rosa – Piano Sonata
 Kaija Saariaho – Petals for cello and electronics
 Bogusław Schaeffer – Concerto for Piano Duet and Orchestra
 Alfred Schnittke 
 Concerto for Piano four hands and Orchestra
 Piano Quartet
 Symphony No. 5 (Concerto Grosso No. 4)
 Klingende Buchstaben
 Peter Sculthorpe – Kakadu
 Philip Sparke – Concerto Grosso
 Bent Sørensen
 Angels' Music for string quartet
 Camelot by Night for bass flute and guitar
 La Notte for piano and orchestra
 Tōru Takemitsu – Tree Line for chamber orchestra
 John Tavener – The Akathist of Thanksgiving
 Takashi Yoshimatsu – Concerto for Bassoon "Unicorn Circuit"

Opera 
 Philip Glass – 1000 Airplanes on the Roof
 Karlheinz Stockhausen – Montag aus Licht (La Scala, Milan, May 7)

Jazz

Musical theater 
 Bitter Sweet (Noël Coward) – London revival
 Chess (Tim Rice, Benny Andersson & Björn Ulvaeus) – Broadway production opened at the Imperial Theatre and closed after 65 performances
 The Phantom of the Opera (Andrew Lloyd Webber) –  Broadway production opened at the Majestic Theatre, and has the longest continuous run in Broadway history, with over 10,000 performances to date
 Sarafina – Broadway production opened at the Cort Theatre and ran for 597 performances

Musical films 
 Bird
 Bridge
 The Decline of Western Civilization Part II: The Metal Years
 Daisy
 Dhwani
 Imagine: John Lennon
 La Bailanta
 Moonwalker
 Rattle and Hum
 Satisfaction
 Tapeheads
 Tougher Than Leather

Births 
January 14
 Mikalah Gordon, American Idol contestant
 Jordy, French singer
January 15 
 Jessica Poland, American singer-songwriter
 Skrillex, American musician and DJ
January 16
 FKA Twigs, born Tahliah Barnett, English singer English singer, songwriter, dancer, advocate and actress. 
 Catherine Gonzaga (or Alex Gonzaga), Filipina singer
 January 20 - Victoria Asher, An American musician. 
January 21 – Glaiza de Castro, Filipino actress and singer
January 25 – Yasmien Kurdi, Filipina pop singer
February 3 – Cho Kyu Hyun, Korean pop singer (Super Junior)
February 6 – Bailey Hanks, American actress and singer
February 7 
 Ai Kago, Japanese pop singer
 Lee Joon, South Korean idol singer (MBLAQ), dancer, actor and model
February 8 – Ao Li, Chinese operatic bass-baritone
February 11 – Li Chun, Chinese singer
February 13 – Mike Posner, American singer-songwriter, poet, DJ and music producer
February 17 – Rod Michael, American singer (B3)
February 18 – Changmin ("Max"), Korean pop singer
February 23 – Ashley Cooper, New Zealand pop singer
February 27 – JD Natasha, born Natasha Jeannette Dueñas, American Latin music artist
February 28 
 Milly Edwards, Australian Idol contestant
 Markéta Irglová, Czech songwriter
March 2 
 James Arthur, English singer-songwriter
 Kate Alexa, Australian pop rock singer
Esther Povitsky, American actress, singer, comedian, writer and producer
Nadine Samonte, German pop singer
March 6 – Agnes Carlsson, Swedish pop singer
March 8 – Benny Blanco, American record producer, songwriter, musician 
March 10 – Patrick Henry Hughes, American tenor and trumpeter
March 15 – Lil Dicky, American comedy-rapper
March 16 – Jhené Aiko, American singer-songwriter and rapper
March 17 – Grimes (born Claire Boucher), Canadian singer-songwriter, musician, engineer, record producer, visual artist, feminist, activist and producer (collaborator of Hana) 
March 18
 Agir, Portuguese singer and composer
 Soukaina Boukries, Moroccan singer
March 25 
 Big Sean, American rapper
 Ryan Lewis, American musician
March 27 – Jessie J, English singer-songwriter
March 31 – Conrad Sewell, Australian singer/songwriter
April 17 – Takahiro Moriuchi, Japanese singer (One Ok Rock)
April 19 – Alfie Arcuri, Australian singer-songwriter
April 24 – Natalie Zahra, Australian Idol contestant
April 25 – Sara Paxton, American singer/actress
April 27 
 Alfred Hui, Hong Kong singer
 Lizzo, born Melissa Jefferson, American singer-songwriter, actress, rapper and activist
 Pop Wansel, American record producer, musician and songwriter
April 29 
 Younha, Japanese and Korean pop singer
 Michael Ray, American country music singer-songwriter
May 5
 Adele, English singer-songwriter
 Brooke Hogan, American actress, singer-songwriter and wrestler
 Skye Sweetnam, Canadian singer-songwriter, actress and music video director (Sumo Cyco) 
May 8 – Trisha Paytas, American Internet personality, actress and singer-songwriter
May 11 – Ace Hood, American rapper
May 13 – Casey Donovan, Australian Idol winner, 2004
May 18 – Tanner Wayne, American drummer (Underminded, Chiodos and Scary Kids Scaring Kids)
May 21 – Park Gyu-ri, South Korean idol singer
May 22 – Roy English, also known as Jagwar Twin, American singer-songwriter, musician and record producer
May 24 – Billy Gilman, American country singer
June 1
Héloïse Letissier, French singer-songwriter (Christine and the Queens)
Nami Tamaki, Japanese singer
June 3 – Dave East, American rapper
June 6 – Neha Kakkar, Indian pop singer
June 7 – Michael Cera, Canadian actor, comedian, producer and singer-songwriter
June 9 – Mae Whitman, American actress, voice actress and singer
June 11 – Weyes Blood, American musician 
June 12 – Dave Melillo, American singer-songwriter
June 14 – Kevin McHale, American actor, singer, dancer and radio personality
June 16
Banks, American singer-songwriter
Keshia Chanté, Canadian urban singer
June 18 – Josh Dun, American multi instrumentalist and producer (House Of Heroes, Twenty One Pilots)r 
June 20 – May J., Japanese R&B singer
June 22 
 Miliyah Kato, Japanese R&B singer
 Vicky Psarakis, a Greek American vocalist-singer-songwriter, lead singer of The Agonist
 June 23
 Isabella Leong, Hong Kong singer, actress and model
 Jasmine Kara, Swedish singer-songwriter
June 24 – Nichkhun Horvejkul, Thai singer
June 27 – Colin Tilley, American music video director and film maker
June 28 – Julian Waterfall Pollack, American jazz pianist and composer
June 29 – Martina Šindlerová, Slovak pop singer
July 2 – Amali Ward, Australian Idol contestant
July 6 
 Katy Tiz, British singer 
 Brittany Underwood, American actress and singer
July 7 – Kaci Brown, American pop/R&B singer
July 8 
 Reinaldo Zavarce, Venezuelan actor and singer
 Shocka, a rapper and mental health advocate from Tottenham, London. 
July 11 – Natalie La Rose, Dutch singer-songwriter and dancer
July 12 – Melissa O'Neil, Canadian Idol winner, Canadian singer and actress
July 13 
 Tulisa Contostavlos, British singer-songwriter and member of N-Dubz
 Colton Haynes, American actor, model and singer
 Mitch Rowland, Harry Styles based, American songwriter and multi-instrumentalist (married to Sarah Jones) 
July 17 – Anderson East, American rhythm and blues singer/songwriter
July 19 - Charlene Soraia, English singer-songwriter and mental health activist
July 20 – Julianne Hough, American dancer, singer and actress
 July 24 – Han Seung-yeon, South Korean singer and actress
July 25 – Sarah Geronimo, Filipina pop singer
July 28 – Nick Santino, American singer-songwriter and guitarist (A Rocket to the Moon)
July 31 – Ruston Kelly, American country singer-songwriter (Kacey Musgrave's)
August 2 –
 Chris Sebastian, Australian singer-songwriter (two time contestant of The Voice Australia, one time on Seal get to round 16 (2012) and won on team Kelly Rowland (2020), brother of Guy Sebastian)  
 Brittany Hargest, American pop singer
August 3 - Shelley FKA DRAM,  American rapper, singer, and record producer
August 4 – Tom Parker, English singer-songwriter (The Wanted)
August 13 – MØ, Danish singer-songwriter 
August 16 – Rumer Willis, American singer and actress 
August 18 – G-Dragon, Korean rapper, singer-songwriter and producer
August 19 – Hoodie Allen, American rapper, singer-songwriter
August 21 – Kacey Musgraves, American country singer-songwriter
August 23 – Alice Glass, Canadian singer-songwriter
August 24 - Kelly Lee Owens, Welsh electronic musician
August 25 – Alexandra Burke, English singer-songwriter and actress, X Factor winner 
August 26 
 Erik Hassle, Swedish pop singer-songwriter
 Evan Ross, American actor and musician (Diana Ross, Ashlee Simpson) 
August 27 – Alexa Vega, American musical performer, actor and pop singer
September 3 – Devon Welsh Canadian singer-songwriter (Majical Cloudz, Grimes) 
September 6 
 Max George, British singer-songwriter and actor
 Gustav Schäfer, German rock drummer (Tokio Hotel)
September 12
 Amanda Jenssen, Swedish singer
 Matt Martians, American record producer
September 14 - Muni Long,  American singer and songwriter.[
September 16 – Teddy Geiger, American singer-songwriter
September 19 – Reigan Derry, Australian singer-songwriter
September 22 – Bethany Dillon, American Christian-music artist
September 26 
 James Blake, English singer-songwriter, musician and record producer (Jameela Jamil, Theresa Waymen)
 Lilly Singh, Canadian vlogger, singer, rapper and artist
September 27 – Alma, French singer-songwriter
September 28 
 Esmée Denters, Dutch singer and YouTuber
 Hana Mae Lee, American actress, model, singer and fashion designer (Pitch Perfect) 
September 30 – Jyongri, Japanese pop singer
October 2 – Andreas Moe, Swedish singer-songwriter, producer and multi-instrumentalist
October 3 – A$AP Rocky, American rapper, producer, part of the ASAP mob (Rihanna}
October 4 
 Jessica Benson, American R&B singer
 Melissa Benoist, American actress and singer
October 5 – Kevin Olusola, Nigerian musician, beatboxer, cellist, rapper, record producer and singer-songwriter
October 11 – Knut Eirik Kokkin, Norwegian singer
October 12 – Calum Scott, British singer-songwriter
October 14 - Kobra Paige, Canadian singer and songwriter
October 17 
 Dami Im, Korean-born Australian singer-songwriter, multi-instrumentalist
 Nikki Flores, American Independent pop singer, musician, songwriter and vocal producer
October 20 
 Risa Niigaki, Japanese pop singer
 A$AP Ferg, American rapper, part of the ASAP mob
 Balqees, Emirati singer
October 23 – Caleigh Peters, American pop singer
October 28 – Jamie xx, English musician, DJ, record producer and remixer
November 2 – Elgiazar Farashyan, Belarusian singer
November 6 
 Emma Stone, American actress, musical star and singer
 Conchita Wurst, Austrian singer, Eurovision Song Contest 2014 winner 
November 7 –  Tinie Tempah, English rapper, singer-songwriter
November 8 - Pauli Lovejoy,  UK born drummer, recording artist, music director and model. 
November 10 – Chisaki Hama, Japanese singer
November 16 
 Siva Kaneswaran, British singer, model, actor and songwriter 
 Sampha, British singer-songwriter and record producer
November 26 - Blake Harnage, American songwriter, music producer, multi-instrumentalist and composer.
November 28 – Scarlett Pomers, American singer/actress
November 30 – Eir Aoi, Japanese singer
December 1 
 Tyler Joseph, American singer-songwriter, multi-instrumentalist, record producer and rapper (Twenty One Pilots)
 Zoë Kravitz, American actress, singer and model (lolawolf) 
December 6 – Sandra Nurmsalu, Estonian musician
December 7 
 Emily Browning, Australian actress and singer (Sucker Punch, God Help The Girl, Plush)
 Toru Yamashita, Japanese singer (One Ok Rock)
 Benjamin Clementine, English-born singer-songwriter
 December 12 – Hahm Eun-jung, South Korean singer
December 14
 Awkwafina, American rapper, comedienne, actor 
 Vanessa Hudgens, American actor, singer, dancer
December 16 – Park Seo-joon, South Korean actor and singer
December 19 – Casey Burgess, Australian singer-songwriter and actress
December 21 – Alexa Goddard, English pop and R&B singer, YouTuber
December 23 – Eri Kamei, Japanese pop singer
December 25 – Marco Mengoni, Italian singer-songwriter
December 26 – Veronika Eberle, German violinist
December 27 
 Hayley Williams, American singer-songwriter, musician, businesswoman and activist (Paramore)
 Lou Yixiao, Chinese singer
December 28 – Florrie, English singer-songwriter, drummer and model
December 30 – James Hall, British singer-songwriter
December 31 – Holly Holyoake, Welsh classical soprano singer
Unknown – Jihae, South Korean rock singer and actress

Deaths 
January 3 – John Dopyera, stringed instrument maker, 94
January 19 – Evgeny Mravinsky, conductor
February 3 – Radamés Gnattali, Brazilian composer, 81
February 9 – Kurt Herbert Adler, conductor and opera administrator
February 14 – Frederick Loewe, composer of musicals, 86
February 16 – Jean Carignan, fiddler, 71
February 17 – Alexander Bashlachev, Russian singer, 27 (falling from height)
February 24 – Memphis Slim, blues musician, 72
February 27 – Gene de Paul, pianist and composer, 68
March 6 – Jeanne Aubert, singer and actress, 88
March 7 – Divine, singer and drag entertainer, 42 (heart failure)
March 8 – Henryk Szeryng, violinist
March 10 – William Wordsworth, Scottish composer
March 10 – Andy Gibb, singer, 30 (myocarditis)
March 12 – Gianna Pederzini, operatic mezzo-soprano, 88
March 15 – Frank Perkins, American song composer
March 20 – Gil Evans, Canadian jazz pianist, composer and bandleader
April 3 – Kai Ewans, Danish jazz musician
April 7 – Cesar Bresgen, Austrian composer
April 9
 Brook Benton, 56 (complications of spinal meningitis)
 David Prater, of Sam & Dave, 50 (car accident)
April 15 – Youri Egorov, Soviet classical pianist, 33 (complications of AIDS)
April 29 – James McCracken, tenor, 61
May 1 – Claude Demetrius, songwriter
May 10 – Ciarán Bourke, folk musician (The Dubliners), 53 (brain damage)
May 13 – Chet Baker, jazz musician, 58 (head injuries from fall)
May 21 – Sammy Davis Sr., vaudeville performer, 87
May 22 – Dennis Day, US singer, 72
May 25 – Martin Slavin, composer and music director, 66
June 12 – Marcel Poot, Belgian composer, 87
June 22 – Jesse Ed Davis, guitarist, 43
June 25 
Hillel Slovak, Red Hot Chili Peppers, guitarist, 26 (speedball overdose)
Jimmy Soul, American singer, 45 (heart attack)
July 2 – Eddie Vinson, jazz/blues musician, 70
July 18
 Joly Braga Santos, Portuguese composer and conductor, 64
 Nico, German singer, 49 (brain haemorrhage)
July 20 – Richard Holm, German operatic tenor
 July 28 – Pete Drake, American record producer and pedal steel guitar player, 55 (emphysema)
 August – Tenor Saw, dancehall artist, 21 (road accident)
August 8 – Félix Leclerc, folk singer, 74
August 9 – Giacinto Scelsi, composer and poet, 83
August 14 
 Roy Buchanan, American guitarist, 48 (suicide)
 Robert Calvert, South African writer, poet, and musician, 43 (heart attack)
August 19 – Sir Frederick Ashton, British choreographer, 83
August 22 – Frances James, operatic soprano, 85
August 24
 Kenneth Leighton, English composer
 Nat Stuckey, American country singer
September 17 – Hilde Gueden, operatic soprano, 71
September 22 – Rezső Sugár, Hungarian composer, 68
September 23 – Arwel Hughes, composer and conductor
September 26 – Lord Melody, calypso musician, 62
October 7 – Billy Daniels, singer, 73
October 15 – Kaikhosru Shapurji Sorabji, English composer, music critic and pianist
October 18 – Sir Frederick Ashton, dancer and choreographer
October 19 – Son House, blues musician
October 20 – Mogens Wöldike, Danish conductor
November 8 – Warren Casey, US theatre composer, lyricist, writer, and actor, 53 (AIDS-related)
November 13
Antal Doráti, conductor, 82
Jaromír Vejvoda, Czech composer, 86
November 24 – Irmgard Seefried, operatic soprano, 69
November 26 – Antonio Estévez, composer
November 30 – Charlie Rouse, saxophonist, 64
December 2 – Tata Giacobetti, Italian singer and lyricist (Quartetto Cetra)
December 6 – Roy Orbison, singer, 52 (heart attack)
December 16 – Sylvester, R&B singer, disco performer, 41 (complications from AIDS)
December 21 – Paul Jeffreys, bassist (Cockney Rebel), 36 (killed in the crash of Pan Am Flight 103)
December 25 – Evgeny Golubev, Russian composer, 78
December 26 – Pablo Sorozábal, Spanish composer, 91
date unknown 
Kenneth Morris, gospel composer and publisher, 71
Håkan Parkman, Swedish composer, arranger and choral director, 33 (drowned)

Awards 
 The following artists are inducted into the Rock and Roll Hall of Fame: The Beach Boys, The Beatles, The Drifters, Bob Dylan, and The Supremes.

Grammy Awards 
 Grammy Awards of 1988

Country Music Association Awards
 1988 Country Music Association Awards

Eurovision Song Contest 
 Eurovision Song Contest 1988

Charts 
 List of Hot 100 number-one singles of 1988 (U.S.)

See also 
 Record labels established in 1988

References 

 
20th century in music
Music by year